Bavan (also Romanized as Bavān and Bovān; also known as Bohon and Bohun) is a village in Manzariyeh Rural District, in the Central District of Shahreza County, Isfahan Province, Iran. At the 2006 census, its population was 179, in 62 families.

References 

Populated places in Shahreza County